Estelle Rolle Evans (October 1, 1906 – July 20, 1985) was a Bahamian American actress during the 20th century. Some of her most famous appearances were in the movies The Quiet One (1948),  To Kill a Mockingbird (1962), and The Learning Tree (1969).

Evans was the sister of actresses Rosanna Carter and Esther Rolle.

Personal life and death

Evans was born Estelle Rolle on October 1, 1906, in Nassau, New Providence, The Bahamas, to parents Jonathan and Elizabeth Iris Rolle (née Dames). She was the oldest of eighteen children. Her sisters include actresses Rosanna Carter and Esther Rolle.

Evans was married once, to Walter Evans. The two had three daughters: Eliza, Ella and Estella Evans.

Evans played Calpurnia in the 1962 film version of To Kill a Mockingbird and acted in several other major movies and television shows. For her work in The Learning Tree, she received the NAACP Image Award for Outstanding Actress in a Motion Picture.

Evans died on July 20, 1985, in New York City, New York, and was buried in Westview Community Cemetery in Pompano Beach, Florida. She was 78 years old.

Filmography

References

External links

Estelle Evans and the Learning Tree: How Bahamas-Born Actress Got Star Role in Parks' Film

1906 births
1982 deaths
American film actresses
American stage actresses
American television actresses
Bahamian emigrants to the United States
People from Nassau, Bahamas